The Makara River is a river in the Chatham Islands of New Zealand. Located in the southeast of Chatham Island, it runs northeast to become a tributary of the Te Awainanga River, which flows into Te Whanga Lagoon.

References

Rivers of the Chatham Islands
Chatham Island